The 1950–51 NBA season was the Blackhawks' second season in the NBA and the last in Moline, IL.

Offseason

Draft picks

Roster

Regular season

Season standings

x – clinched playoff spot

Record vs. opponents

Game log

Player statistics

Season

Awards and records
Frank Brian, All-NBA Second Team

Transactions

References

See also
1950-51 NBA season

Atlanta Hawks seasons
Tri
Atlanta Hawks
Atlanta Hawks